The 7th Golden Globe Awards, honoring the best in film for 1949 films, were held on February 23, 1950.

Winners and Nominees

Best Picture
 All the King's Men directed by Robert Rossen
Come to the Stable directed by Henry Koster

Best Actor in a Leading Role
 Broderick Crawford - All the King's Men
Richard Todd - The Hasty Heart

Best Actress in a Leading Role
 Olivia de Havilland - The Heiress
Deborah Kerr - Edward, My Son

Best Performance by an Actor in a Supporting Role in a Motion Picture
 James Whitmore - Battleground
David Brian - Intruder in the Dust

Best Performance by an Actress in a Supporting Role in a Motion Picture
 Mercedes McCambridge - All the King's Men
Miriam Hopkins - The Heiress

Best Director - Motion Picture
 Robert Rossen - All the King's Men
William Wyler - The Heiress

Best Screenplay - Motion Picture
 Battleground - Robert Pirosh 
Rope of Sand - Walter Doniger

Best Music, Original Score - Motion Picture
 The Inspector General - Johnny Green
All the King's Men - George Duning

Best Foreign Language Film
 Bicycle Thieves (Ladri di biciclette), Italy
The Fallen Idol, UK

Best Cinematography - Black and White
 Champion photographed by Franz F. Planer
All the King's Men photographed by Burnett Guffey

Best Cinematography - Color
 The Adventures of Ichabod and Mr. Toad by Walt Disney
On The Town by Harold Rosson

Promoting International Understanding
 The Hasty Heart directed by Vincent Sherman
Monsieur Vincent directed by Maurice Cloche

New Star of the Year - Actor
 Richard Todd in The Hasty Heart
Juano Hernandez in Intruder in the Dust

New Star of the Year - Actress
 Mercedes McCambridge in All the King's Men
Ruth Roman in Champion

References

007
1949 film awards
1949 television awards
February 1950 events in the United States